The Highgate Vampire was a media sensation surrounding reports of supposed supernatural activity at Highgate Cemetery in London, England, United Kingdom, in the 1970s. The most thorough account of the story is given by folklorist Bill Ellis in the journal Folklore, published in 1993.

Initial publicity
On 31 October 1968, a group of young people interested in the occult visited Tottenham Park Cemetery, at a time when it was being regularly vandalised by intruders. According to a report in the London Evening News of 2 November 1968:

Though the identities and motivations of those responsible were never ascertained, general consensus at the time linked the desecration to events surrounding the Highgate Vampire case. 

Then, in a letter to the Hampstead and Highgate Express on 6 February 1970, David Farrant wrote that when passing Highgate Cemetery on 24 December 1969 he had glimpsed "a grey figure", which he considered to be supernatural, and asked if others had seen anything similar. On the 13th, several people replied, describing a variety of ghosts said to haunt the cemetery or the adjoining Swains Lane. These ghosts were described as a tall man in a hat, a spectral cyclist, a woman in white, a face glaring through the bars of a gate, a figure wading into a pond, a pale gliding form, bells ringing, and voices calling.

Sean Manchester claimed Farrant's "grey figure" was a vampire and the media quickly latched on, embellishing the tale with stories of the vampire being a king of the vampires, or of practising black magic.

March 1970 mob
The ensuing publicity was enhanced by a growing rivalry between Farrant and Manchester, each claiming that he could and would expel or destroy the spectre. Manchester declared he would hold an exorcism on Friday 13 of March 1970. ITV conducted interviews with Manchester, Farrant, and others who claimed to have seen supernatural figures in the cemetery, which were transmitted early on the evening of the 13th; within two hours a mob of 'hunters' from all over London and beyond swarmed over gates and walls into the locked cemetery, despite police efforts to control them. 

Some months later, on 1 August 1970, the charred and headless remains of a woman's body were found not far from the catacomb. The police suspected that it had been used in black magic. Farrant was found by police in the churchyard beside the cemetery one night in August, carrying a crucifix and a wooden stake. He was arrested, but when the case came to court it was dismissed.

A few days later Manchester returned to Highgate Cemetery. He claims that this time he and his companions forced open the doors of a family vault (indicated by his psychic helper). He says he lifted the lid off one coffin, believing it to have been mysteriously transferred there from the previous catacomb. He was about to drive a stake through the body it contained when a companion persuaded him to desist. Reluctantly, he shut the coffin, leaving garlic and incense in the vault.

Aftermath
There was more publicity about Farrant and Manchester when rumours spread that they would meet in a "magicians' duel" on Parliament Hill on Friday 13 April 1973, which never occurred. Farrant was jailed in 1974 for damaging memorials and interfering with dead remains in Highgate Cemetery—vandalism and desecration which he insisted had been caused by Satanists, not him.

Farrant and Manchester wrote and spoke repeatedly about the Highgate Vampire, each stressing his own role to the exclusion of the other. Each attempted to control the narrative around the vampire, resulting in ongoing animosity and rivalry between the two. Their feud continued for decades, marked by insults and vindictiveness, until Farrant's death in April 2019.

In popular culture
According to author Bill Ellis, the Hammer Horror film Dracula AD 1972, starring Christopher Lee and Peter Cushing, was inspired by the Highgate Vampire.
The Highgate Vampire appears as a villain in the Dark Horse comics series Buffy the Vampire Slayer Season Nine. The Highgate Vampire is revealed to be, not a vampire, but an insectoid demon that feeds off its victims' emotional trauma. Rupert Giles had nearly been killed by the creature in 1972. The Highgate Vampire became a minion of Drusilla when it returned in the 2010s.
Il vampiro di Highgate (Highgate Vampire) is the title of 45th issue of Italian horror comic book series Dampyr.
The Highgate Vampire was covered on episode 388 of The Last Podcast On The Left.

References

Further reading
 Barlay, Nick. (10 July 2004) The Times "Zzzzz London;Z is for...;A-Z;London Life" Section: Features; Page 31.
 Beresford, Matthew. From Demons to Dracula: The Creation of the Modern Vampire Myth (London: Reaktion Books, 2008), 175-92.
 Campbell, Ramsey. "The Strange Case of Seán Manchester" in Ramsey Campbell, Probably (PS Publishing, 2002). The essay is expanded in the revised edition of the book.
Ellis, Bill. "The Highgate Cemetery Vampire Hunt", Folklore 104 (1993), 13-39. This journal can be read online via the JStor site.
 Ellis, Bill. (1993) Folklore ["The Highgate Cemetery vampire hunt: the Anglo-American connection in satanic cult lore"] Volume 104; Issue 1/2; Page 13.
Farrant, David. Beyond the Highgate Vampire (London: British Psychic and Occult Society, 1991).
Farrant, David. In the Shadow of the Highgate Vampire: An Autobiography Volume 1" (London: British Psychic and Occult Society, 2011)
Farrant, David. Out of the Shadows: An Autobiography Volume 2" (London: British Psychic and Occult Society, 2011)
Manchester, Sean. The Highgate Vampire (London: British Occult Society Gothic Press, 1985)
Manchester, Sean. From Satan To Christ (London: Holy Grail, 1988)
Manchester, Sean. The Vampire Hunter's Handbook (London: Gothic Press, 1997)
 Financial Times (27 April 1988) Observer: Missing Manchester Page 22.
 Holly, Donald H Jr; Cordy, Casey E; (Summer 2007) Journal of American Folklore "What's In a Coin? Reading the Material Culture of Legend Tripping and Other Activities" Volume 120, Number 477, pp. 335–354.
Underwood, Peter. The Vampire's Bedside Companion (1975; revised ed., 1976).
 McKay, Sinclair. (6 May 2006) The Daily Telegraph "The loved ones of London Sinclair McKay is beguiled by an account of how the capital once dealt with its dead" Section: Books; Page 5.
 Page, Carol, "Blood Lust:  Conversations with Real Vampires, (HarperCollins, 1991, Dell, 1992, Warner, ULK, 1993)
 Simpson, Jacqueline. (1 April 2003) Folklore "Raising the Devil: Satanism, New Religions, and the Media" Volume 114; Issue 1; Page 123.

External links
 The Highgate Vampire  Archive BBC film footage and interviews with Sean Manchester.
 David Farrant In Search of the Highgate Vampire  Archive documentary film produced by David Farrant.

Vampires
Paranormal hoaxes
Hoaxes in England
1970 hoaxes
London folklore
1970 in London
History of the London Borough of Camden
Highgate